TEFKROS is a domestic submarine telecommunications cable system in the Mediterranean Sea along the coast of Cyprus.

It has landing points in:
 Pentaskhinos
 Ayia Napa (Greek: Αγία Νάπα), Famagusta District (Greek:Επαρχία Αμμόχωστου)

It has a design transmission capacity of 4 x 2.5 Gbit/s and a total cable length of 82 km.  It started operation in 1994.

Sources
 

Submarine communications cables in the Mediterranean Sea
1994 establishments in Cyprus